The Copa del Rey de Futsal is an annual cup competition for Spanish futsal teams. It is organized by the Royal Spanish Football Federation and was founded in the 2010–11 season.

Finals

Winners by titles

Related competitions
 Primera División de Futsal
 Segunda División de Futsal
 Supercopa de España de Futsal
 Copa de España de Futsal

External links
 rfef.es
 lnfs.es

 
Futsal competitions in Spain
Spain